Leonard Oswald Mosley  (11 February 1913 – June 1992) was a British journalist, historian, biographer and novelist. His works include five novels and biographies of General George Marshall, Reichsmarschall Hermann Göring, Orde Wingate, Walt Disney, Charles Lindbergh, Du Pont family, Eleanor Dulles, Allen Welsh Dulles, John Foster Dulles and Darryl F. Zanuck. He also worked as chief war correspondent for London's The Sunday Times.

Biography
Leonard Oswald Mosley was born in Manchester, England on 11 February 1913, the son of Leonard Cyril Mosley and Annie Althea Mosley née Glaiser. He was educated at William Hulme's Grammar School. At the age of seventeen he started work as a reporter for the Telegraph, a weekly paper, since defunct, which circulated in South Lancashire and North Cheshire. After a year working there he lost his job as a result of an ill-timed practical joke, and then spent six months as a freelance, living in his parental home in Didsbury. During the summer of 1931 he left England and made his way to America.

In New York he spent three months as an Assistant Stage Manager for a burlesque show, then for half a year worked as a journalist for the New York Daily Mirror. In May 1932 he left the East Coast and drove to California in an old Ford Model T. He arrived in Los Angeles just in time for the 1932 Summer Olympics, which he covered as an employee of United Press. He subsequently worked as a freelance journalist in Hollywood. He reported on the 1933 Long Beach earthquake, returning to England shortly afterwards.

He found employment as a roving reporter, a job that took him all over the world. One early assignment which brought him back to the United States and made a great impression on him was the trial of Richard Hauptmann for the Lindbergh kidnapping. Many years later he would write a biography of Lindbergh.

Books

 - published in US as Europe Down-Stream

 - in 1955 made into the film They Can't Hang Me

 - about Valentine Browne, 6th Earl of Kenmare
- the story of John Eppler, later made into the film Foxhole in Cairo

 (Published in United States as The Glorious Fault: The Life of Lord Curzon).

 - about George Marshall; published in US as Marshall: Organizer of Victory (but not to be confused with the book of identical title by Forrest C. Pogue)

 
 - Biography of Charles Lindbergh

 - published in UK as The Real Walt Disney

Honours
In June 1946 he was appointed an OBE (Officer of the Order of the British Empire) for his work at Kemsley Newspapers. (He was then on the staff of the Daily Express).
In June 1964 he was appointed as an officer of the Order of the Hospital of St. John of Jerusalem.

References

External links
http://www.librarything.com/author/mosleyleonard

1913 births
1992 deaths
British biographers
British male journalists
British historians
British war correspondents
Writers from Manchester
20th-century British novelists
20th-century biographers
British male novelists
Officers of the Order of the British Empire
20th-century English male writers
Male biographers